Île aux Nattes (also officially, but less commonly, called Nosy Nato) is a small island south of Île Sainte-Marie, an island off the east coast of Madagascar. Both belong to Toamasina Province.

References

Nattes, Ile aux
Toamasina Province